MEST is an acronym used in Scientology and coined by author L. Ron Hubbard. Hubbard used the first letters of the words matter, energy, space and time, the component parts of the physical universe.
Writings and lectures by Scientology founder L. Ron Hubbard frequently use the term MEST in place of the phrase "the physical universe". According to Hubbard, "theta energy" (souls or spiritual entitites) exists in a separate universe from the MEST universe, with theta influencing MEST. Hubbard described the purpose of the "Theta Universe" as "the conquest, change, and ordering of MEST".

Dianetics also utilized the concept of MEST.

Ethnic minorities and MEST

African Americans and MEST
Hubbard felt that African Americans had a tendency to personify the MEST universe by giving objects personalities: "Actually, have you ever noticed how a negro, in particular, down south, where they're pretty close to the soil, personifies MEST? The gate post and the wagon and the whip and anything around there. A hat they talk to 'em, you know. 'Wassa madda wit you, hat?' They imbue them, with personality."

See also
 PMEST (Personality, Matter, Energy, Space, Time) in Ranganathan's colon classification introduced in 1933.

References

External links
 Former Church of Scientology executive Stacy Brooks explains MEST

Scientology beliefs and practices